In continuum mechanics, the Péclet number (after Jean Claude Eugène Péclet) is a class of dimensionless numbers relevant in the study of transport phenomena in a continuum. It is defined to be the ratio of the rate of advection of a physical quantity by the flow to the rate of diffusion of the same quantity driven by an appropriate gradient. In the context of species or mass transfer, the Péclet number is the product of the Reynolds number and the Schmidt number. In the context of the thermal fluids, the thermal Péclet number is equivalent to the product of the Reynolds number and the Prandtl number.

The Péclet number is defined as:
 

For mass transfer, it is defined as:

Such ratio can also be re-written in terms of times, as a ratio between the characteristic temporal intervals of the system:

For    the diffusion happens in a much longer time compared to the convection, and therefore the latter of the two phenomena predominates in the mass transport. 

For heat transfer, the Péclet number is defined as:

where  is the characteristic length,  the local flow velocity,  the mass diffusion coefficient,  the Reynolds number,  the Schmidt number,  the Prandtl number, and  the thermal diffusivity,

where  is the thermal conductivity,  the density, and  the specific heat capacity.

In engineering applications the Péclet number is often very large. In such situations, the dependency of the flow upon downstream locations is diminished, and variables in the flow tend to become 'one-way' properties. Thus, when modelling certain situations with high Péclet numbers, simpler computational models can be adopted.

A flow will often have different Péclet numbers for heat and mass. This can lead to the phenomenon of double diffusive convection.

In the context of particulate motion the Péclet number has also been called Brenner number, with symbol , in honour of Howard Brenner.

The Péclet number also finds applications beyond transport phenomena, as a general measure for the relative importance of the random fluctuations and of the systematic average behavior in mesoscopic systems

See also
 Nusselt number

References

Convection
Dimensionless numbers of fluid mechanics
Dimensionless numbers of thermodynamics
Fluid dynamics
Heat conduction